Revelation 4 is the fourth chapter of the Book of Revelation or the Apocalypse of John in the New Testament of the Christian Bible. The book is traditionally attributed to John the Apostle, but the precise identity of the author remains a point of academic debate. This chapter contains an inaugural vision of heaven, portraying the throne room of heaven, and the heavenly worship which the writer observes there.

Text
The original text was written in Koine Greek. This chapter is divided into 11 verses.

Textual witnesses
Some early manuscripts containing the text of this chapter are among others:
Codex Sinaiticus (330-360)
Uncial 0169 (4th century; extant verses 1–3)
Codex Alexandrinus (400-440)

God on the Throne
God's sovereignty over all things is symbolized by the throne, which visions are found both in the Hebrew Bible/Old Testament prophetic tradition (cf. ) as well as in some Jewish apocalypses, and in this chapter (echoing Isaiah 6 and Ezekiel 1) is seen as "already fully acknowledged in heaven, and therefore as the true reality which must in the end prevail on earth". Taken up into heaven, John can see that "God's throne is the ultimate reality behind all earthly appearances".

Verse 1
After these things I looked, and behold, a door standing open in heaven.And the first voice which I heard was like a trumpet speaking with me, saying, "Come up here, and I will show you things which must take place after this.""After these things" refers back to "the entire vision in Revelation 1:10 to ".

Verse 8 The four living creatures, each having six wings, were full of eyes around and within. And they do not rest day or night, saying:“Holy, holy, holy,Lord God Almighty,Who was and is and is to come!”"Four living creatures": reflecting a combination of the cherubim in Ezekiel 1 and seraphim in Isaiah 6:2, they function as 'the priests of heavenly temple'. Their song is an adaption of Isaiah 6:3 with the incorporation of 'two of the key designations of God' (cf. Revelation 1:4, 8).

Verse 11 "You are worthy, O Lord,To receive glory and honor and power;For You created all things,And by Your will they exist and were created."''
The depiction of God's sovereignty starts with him as the 'Creator of all things', then as 'Redeemer' to restore his universal sovereignty on earth (Revelation 5), with the expectation to renew his whole creation in the end (Revelation 21:5).

See also
Book of Daniel
Holy, Holy, Holy! Lord God Almighty, 19th-century English Christian hymn
John the Apostle
John's vision of the Son of Man
Revelation Song
Tetramorph
Related Bible parts: Isaiah 6, Ezekiel 1, Revelation 5, Revelation 6

Notes

References

Bibliography

External links
 King James Bible - Wikisource
English Translation with Parallel Latin Vulgate 
Online Bible at GospelHall.org (ESV, KJV, Darby, American Standard Version, Bible in Basic English)
Multiple bible versions at Bible Gateway (NKJV, NIV, NRSV etc.)

04